Jean-Carlos Anthony Garcia (born 5 July 1992) is a Gibraltarian footballer who plays for Gibraltar National League side Lynx, and the Gibraltar national team. Mainly a right back, he can also play as a right winger.

International career

Garcia was first called up to the Gibraltar senior team in May 2014 for friendlies against Estonia and Malta. He made his international début with Gibraltar on 26 May 2014 in a 1–1 draw with Estonia, coming on as a 67th-minute substitute for David Artell. His second appearance came in a 1–0 home win against Malta on 4 June 2014.

International statistics

.

References

External links

1992 births
Living people
Gibraltarian footballers
Gibraltar international footballers
Association football defenders
F.C. Bruno's Magpies players
Gibraltar Phoenix F.C. players
Lincoln Red Imps F.C. players
Gibraltar Premier Division players